Edgewater is a census-designated place in Jefferson County, Alabama, United States. It is northeast from the Birmingham suburb of Pleasant Grove. Its population was 883 at the 2010 census. This area was damaged by tornadoes on April 15, 1956 and April 8, 1998. The 1998 tornado was rated F5 on the Fujita scale.

History
Edgwater was originally built as a company town by Tennessee Coal, Iron and Railroad Company.

Geography
Edgewater is located at  (33.523106, -86.956525).

Demographics

Edgewater was initially listed on the 1950 U.S. Census as an unincorporated community. It did not appear again until 2000 when it was designated a CDP (Census Designated Place).

2020 census

As of the 2020 United States census, there were 746 people, 253 households, and 214 families residing in the CDP.

2000 census
As of the census of 2000, there were 730 people, 295 households, and 192 families residing in the CDP. The racial makeup of the CDP was 37.95% White, 61.10% Black or African American, 0.14% from other races, and 0.82% from two or more races. 1.10% of the population were Hispanic or Latino of any race.

There were 295 households, out of which 25.1% had children under the age of 18 living with them, 34.6% were married couples living together, 24.1% had a female householder with no husband present, and 34.6% were non-families. 31.9% of all households were made up of individuals, and 14.9% had someone living alone who was 65 years of age or older. The average household size was 2.47 and the average family size was 3.12.

In the CDP, the population was spread out, with 22.5% under the age of 18, 7.4% from 18 to 24, 25.2% from 25 to 44, 27.8% from 45 to 64, and 17.1% who were 65 years of age or older. The median age was 42 years. For every 100 females, there were 97.3 males. For every 100 females age 18 and over, there were 85.6 males.

The median income for a household in the CDP was $21,322, and the median income for a family was $47,240. Males had a median income of $26,786 versus $20,962 for females. The per capita income for the CDP was $14,240. About 2.5% of families and 10.2% of the population were below the poverty line, including 9.3% of those under age 18 and 14.4% of those age 65 or over.

Notable people
 Sam Frazier Jr., blues singer, songwriter, guitar and harmonica player
 Mule Suttles, Negro league baseball player and member of the Baseball Hall of Fame

References

External links

History of Edgewater, Alabama

Birmingham metropolitan area, Alabama
Census-designated places in Alabama
Census-designated places in Jefferson County, Alabama
Historic American Engineering Record in Alabama
Tennessee Coal, Iron and Railroad Company
Company towns in Kentucky